Euchalcia bellieri is a moth of the family Noctuidae.

Etymology
Latin species name bellieri honors the French entomologist Jean-Baptiste Eugène Bellier de la Chavignerie (1819-1888).

Description
This rare species closely resemble Euchalcia variabilis, but it is quite smaller. The upperside of the forewings shows a well marked oblique inner line with a slight rosy border. The central area is dark brown, while the hind margin is rosy. The basal dark line is angulated. The orbicular stigma is double, with a yellow ring. Larvae are green with a white lateral line.

Caterpillars feed on Delphinium dubium, maybe also on Aconitum species. They are fully grown at the end of June, while adults fly in July.

Distribution
This species is endemic to France (Hautes-Alpes, Basses-Alpes, Alpes Maritimes) and to a northern Italian Region (Piedmont).

References

Plusiinae
Moths described in 1903